Abul Abbas may refer to:
 Abul K. Abbas, chair of pathology at University of California San Francisco
 Abul-Abbas, Asian elephant given to Charlemagne by the Abbasid caliph Harun al-Rashid
 Muhammad I Abu 'l-Abbas, emir of Aghlabids in Ifriqiya